"Doo-Wah Days" is a song written by Edward Hunnicutt, Doug Gilmore and Gary Vincent, and recorded by American country music artist Mickey Gilley.  It was released in July 1986 as the only single from his album One and Only.  The song reached number 6 on the U.S. Billboard Hot Country Singles chart and number 9 on the Canadian RPM Country Tracks chart in Canada.

Chart performance

References

1986 singles
1986 songs
Mickey Gilley songs
Song recordings produced by Norro Wilson
Epic Records singles